Count Henri Delaborde (1811–1899) was a French art critic and historical painter, born in Rennes, son of Count Henri François Delaborde.

Life and career
He studied for some time in Paris with Delaroche and afterward produced historical pictures of a rather conventional classical type. Among them are: 
 Hagar in the Desert (1836, Dijon Museum)
 St. Augustine (1837)
 The Knights of St. John of Jerusalem restoring religion in Armenia (1844), at Versailles

He also painted frescoes in the Saint Clotilde Basilica. But he is known principally as a critic of art. Besides his writings, as perpetual secretary of the Académie des Beaux-Arts, he contributed to the Revue des Deux Mondes and other periodicals. The articles have been collected as Mélanges sur l'art contemporain (1866) and Etudes sur les beaux-arts en France et en Italie (1864). He published, among other volumes: 
 Ingres, sa vie, ses travaux, sa doctrine (1870)
 Lettres et pensés d'Hippolyte Flandrin (1865)
 Gérard Edelinck (1886)
 La gravure (1882)
 La gravure en Italie (1883)
 Marc Antoine Raimondi (1887)
 La Maîtres florentins du XV siècle (1889)
 L'Académie des Beaux-Arts depuis la fondation de l'Institut de France (1891)

Count Delaborde was elected to the Institute in 1868 and was conservator of the department of prints in the National Library, Paris, from 1855 to 1885.

References

 This article incorporates text from a publication now in the public domain: Gilman, D. C.; Peck, H. T.; Colby, F. M., eds. (1905). New International Encyclopedia (1st ed.). New York: Dodd, Mead

External links

 
 

1811 births
1899 deaths
19th-century French painters
French male painters
Fresco painters
19th-century French male artists